Ruby Florence Hutchison (15 February 1892 – 17 December 1974) was an Australian politician. She was a Labor Party member of the Western Australian Legislative Council from 1954 to 1971, representing Suburban Province (1954–1965) and North-East Metropolitan Province (1965–1971).

She was the first woman to be elected to the Legislative Council, the fourth woman to be elected to the Parliament of Western Australia, and with her third marriage in 1966 to Frederick Lavery, the first woman in Australia to serve in parliament alongside her husband.

Prior to entering politics, she was a homemaker, ran boarding houses, and worked as a dressmaker. She was active in community organisations, among her roles being as the founding chairperson of the Epilepsy Association of Western Australia and a founding member of the Australian Consumers Association in Western Australia.

The Ruby Hutchison Memorial Lecture is held annually in her honour by the ACCC and CHOICE.

References

External links

1892 births
1974 deaths
Members of the Western Australian Legislative Council
20th-century Australian politicians
20th-century Australian women politicians
Women members of the Western Australian Legislative Council
19th-century Australian women